Custódio Gouveia (born 27 July 1985) is an Angolan handball player for Inter Clube Angola and the Angolan national team.

He represented Angola at the 2019 World Men's Handball Championship.

References

1985 births
Living people
Angolan male handball players
Competitors at the 2019 African Games
African Games competitors for Angola
African Games medalists in handball
African Games gold medalists for Angola
20th-century Angolan people
21st-century Angolan people